Viktor Jansson (31 December 1919 – 25 September 2006) was a Finnish equestrian. He competed in two events at the 1952 Summer Olympics.

References

1919 births
2006 deaths
Finnish male equestrians
Olympic equestrians of Finland
Equestrians at the 1952 Summer Olympics
Sportspeople from Vyborg